Exile is the second studio album by English synth-pop duo Hurts. It was released on 8 March 2013 by Major Label. The album was produced by Hurts, along with Jonas Quant—with whom the duo worked on their debut album, Happiness (2010)—and Dan Grech-Marguerat. "Miracle" was released on 11 January 2013 as the lead single from the album, followed by "Blind" on 10 May 2013 and "Somebody to Die For" on 21 July 2013. Upon release, Exile debuted at number nine on the UK Albums Chart, while charting inside the top 10 in eight other countries.

Background
The album's title was revealed in December 2012, followed by the track listing and artwork in January and February 2013, respectively. Hurts singer Theo Hutchcraft came up with the title while sitting in a bar in Osaka; he glimpsed it on a scrolling billboard, and it was the only word he could understand. "That sense of being in a weird place. Freedom, fear, isolation, joy, religion, punishment, the decadence that comes with exile—always being on tour, always far away from home. It did feel like we were on the run, always chasing something".

Hutchcraft read Cormac McCarthy's 2006 apocalyptic novel The Road three times while writing the album, which was recorded from January to June 2012. Speaking to NME about Exile, he said: "We had to push ourselves and express the more intense, darker side which lies at the heart of our music. The first record was mainly about love and loss. This is a record about sex and death. The whole process was one of the heaviest and most extreme experiences we've had, but now we're on the outside looking in, it feels like we've made something truly unique and special."

Composition
Compared to Hurts' debut album, Happiness, Exile incorporates more orchestral and rock instrumentation, while retaining the duo's core new wave and krautrock influences. According to Matt Collar of AllMusic, the album "updat[es] their '80s electronic sound with a sparkling, contemporary R&B sheen that weaves in Baroque orchestral sections, choirs of backing vocals, and even some swaggering hard rock guitar attitude." The album's lyrical themes include sadism, sickness, possessiveness and envy.

The album's second track, "Miracle", employs an anthemic chorus and a Depeche Mode-esque backdrop of stadium guitars and synths. Adam Anderson described it as the most effortless song the duo have ever done, and compared writing it to the creation of "Stay" from Happiness. Critics compared "Miracle" to Nine Inch Nails, as well as Coldplay's songs "Paradise" and "Princess of China".

"Sandman" has an R&B feel to it; according to Hutchcraft, the duo aimed to "make a song that sounded like Hudson Mohawke, but as a pop song." The song was described as "a mechanical krautrocky dirge with a pop heart", while its child choir was branded "creepy" and "cloying" by critics.

Inspired by Cormac McCarthy's 2006 apocalyptic novel of the same name and J. G. Ballard's 1973 novel Crash, "The Road" is about a car accident. "We tried to write the darkest song we could", says Hutchcraft. "We thought 'How bleak can we make it?'" He explained, "We wanted people to hear 'The Road' first because it's the most extreme example of the idea on the record."

To record "Help", the duo enlisted a choir made up of fans from around the world. "They were all brilliant", Hutchcraft said. "It was such a powerful thing, watching them. So emotional. To hear a mass of people singing 'I just need some help'. It was heartbreaking."

Release and promotion
Promotion for Exile started with a two-minute mini-promo for "The Road" directed by Nez Khammal, which was unveiled on 14 December 2012. Conceptually, the video takes the viewer on a journey of the life of Hurts members Hutchcraft and Anderson.

Following its premiere on BBC Radio 1 as Zane Lowe's "Hottest Record in the World" on 12 February 2013, the song "Sandman" was made available as a free download from Hurts' official website. The duo performed a cover of Bruno Mars' "Locked Out of Heaven" along with "Miracle" and "Exile" in a live session at BBC Radio 1's Maida Vale Studios for Zane Lowe on 13 February 2013.

In February 2013, Hurts performed a NME Awards show at London's Heaven and a gig at Berlin's Postbahnhof, before embarking on a 12-date European headline tour, which commenced in Cologne on 14 March and ended in Glasgow on 2 April. The second leg of the tour started on 25 October 2013, visiting countries such as the UK, Denmark, Norway, Sweden, Estonia, Czech Republic, Germany and Luxembourg.

Singles
The album's lead single, "Miracle", received its first worldwide radio play on Huw Stephens' BBC Radio 1 breakfast show on 4 January 2013. The song was released digitally in several continental European countries on 11 January 2013 and in the United Kingdom on 10 March 2013. Hurts performed "Miracle" on Dermot O'Leary's BBC Radio 2 show on 9 March 2013, alongside a cover version of "Wonderwall" by Oasis.

"Blind" was released as the album's second single on 10 May 2013. The duo premiered the track during a live session at Absolute Radio. The accompanying video was shot on location in Spain and debuted on 4 April 2013.

"Somebody to Die For" was released on 19 July 2013 as the third single from the album. The duo premiered the track during a special live session at Spotify in January 2013.

Critical reception

Exile received mixed reviews from music critics. At Metacritic, which assigns a weighted mean rating out of 100 to reviews from mainstream critics, the album received an average score of 59, based on 16 reviews, which indicates "mixed or average reviews". Simon Price of The Independent wrote that "Exile employs greater variety than Happiness, from acoustic piano to—shock—what sounds like electric guitar, but without sacrificing any of the grandeur. It's often reminiscent of Soft Cell or late 1980s Depeche Mode. It's on close personal terms with magnificence." AllMusic editor Matt Collar viewed the album as a "bigger, brasher, even more passionate version of the cinematic feel heard on Happiness", adding that "[w]hat's clear about Hurts on Exile is how skilled Hutchcraft and Anderson are at seamlessly incorporating their influences, so you can hear the bands' inspirations in every line even as you marvel that this album is like nothing you've heard before." Dan Martin of NME compared Exile to Muse's album The 2nd Law and stated that, "by hooking their comeback on Exiles lead single 'Miracle', [Hurts] reminded everyone just how bloody fantastic they were at writing anthemic songs." Gareth Ware of This Is Fake DIY expressed that the album "cements [the duo's] place as mainstream pop's most daring and ambitious offering. While the relentless realisation of their film-ready stylings may not be to everyone's tastes, the fact they're here at all in the first place is a cause worth celebrating in itself."

The Guardians Caroline Sullivan commented that "though the duo now incorporate spasms of grotty, Nine Inch Nailsy guitar [...], Exile is still defined by its synth-pop froideur", noting that Hurts have "a gift for striding, anthemic choruses that turn even the most overwrought songs into unshakeable earworms." Chris Saunders of musicOMH complimented Hurts for "making stadium sized pop music with a darker underbelly, without forcing it, in the same black vein as Depeche Mode", while remarking, "Exile isn't a bad album, and Hurts do what they do well [...] Yet Exile is found wanting when they try too much to be the stadium band rather than allowing the drama to play out." Tom Hocknell of BBC Music opined that, although Exile "occasionally takes itself so seriously that it's hard not to smirk", the album "genuinely builds upon its predecessor" and "reinforces the feeling in modern pop that no other group sounds quite as hurt as Hurts." The Observers Hermione Hoby faulted the album for lacking a "killer single" and wrote, "It's all laid on thick—the violins, the choir-sung, stadium-friendly choruses—but the songwriting isn't sturdy enough to hold it all up." In a review for PopMatters, Maria Schurr characterised the duo as "style over substance" and found that musically, the album is "rarely memorable enough". Schurr continued, "No matter how many dark subjects are nested throughout, too often the music on Exile falls back into the same old tricks of bells-and-whistles pop choruses and obvious hooks." Time Out Londons Oliver Keens felt that the album's "poppy moments have become as lazy and humdrum as 'Sandman'", concluding that "too often the desire to directly rival Muse or U2 makes [Hurts] sound lost and featherweight in comparison." John Freeman of Clash stated the album "starts brightly", but critiqued that tracks like "Blind", "Sandman" and "The Rope" "[reduce] Exile to a chilling example of naked ambition prioritising production style over songwriting substance."

Commercial performance
Exile debuted at number nine on the UK Albums Chart, selling 12,124 copies in its first week.

Track listing

Personnel
Credits adapted from the liner notes of the deluxe edition of Exile.

Hurts
 Hurts – programming ; production ; instruments ; keyboards ; guitar ; mixing 
 Adam Anderson – art direction
 Theo Hutchcraft – vocals, art direction

Additional personnel

 Malin Abrahamsson – choir vocals 
 John Barclay – trumpet 
 Dick Beetham – mastering 
 Mark Berrow – violin 
 Rachel Stephanie Bolt – viola 
 Emil Chakalov – violin 
 Dermot Crehan – violin 
 Caroline Dale – cello 
 Dave Daniels – cello 
 Laurence Davies – horn 
 Liz Edwards – violin 
 Richard Edwards – trombone 
 David Emery – assistant engineering 
 Martin Forslund – assistant engineering 
 Duncan Fuller – assistant engineering 
 Karolin Funke – choir vocals 
 Jennifer Götvall – choir vocals 
 Dan Grech-Marguerat – production ; engineering , engineering ; mixing 
 Peter Hanson – violin 
 Jakob Hermann – engineering ; drums 
 The Hurts Choir – additional vocals 
 Garfield Jackson – viola 
 Ted Jensen – mastering 
 Elton John – piano 
 Salome Kent – strings, vocals 
 Patrick Kiernan – violin 
 Boguslaw Kostecki – violin 
 Julian Leaper – violin 
 Gaby Lester – violin 
 Anthony Lewis – cello 
 Martin Loveday – cello 
 Steve Mair – bass 
 Wil Malone – brass arrangement, brass conductor ; trumpet ; string arrangement, string conductor 
 Rita Manning – violin 
 Charl Marais – photography
 Perry Montague-Mason – violin 
 Andy Parker – viola 
 Jonas Quant – instruments ; production, programming ; keyboards ; guitar ; mixing 
 Tom Pigott-Smith – violin 
 Anthony Pleeth – cello 
 Maciej Rakowski – violin 
 Simon Rayner – horn 
 Jonathan Rees – violin 
 Tom Rees-Roberts – trumpet 
 Frank Schaefer – cello 
 Nathalie Schmeikal – backing vocals 
 Mary Scully – bass 
 Shilling & Shilling – design
 Emlyn Singleton – violin 
 Oskar Stenmark – bass guitar, trombone, trumpet 
 Per Stenbeck – bass guitar 
 Spike Stent – mixing 
 Tina Sunnero – choir vocals 
 Cathy Thompson – violin 
 Chris Tombling – violin 
 Allen Walley – bass 
 Paul Walsham – drums 
 Vicci Wardman – viola 
 Richard Watkins – horn 
 Pete Watson – bass guitar ; piano ; performer 
 Bruce White – viola 
 Andy Wood – trombone 
 Steve Wright – viola 
 Warren Zielinski – violin

Charts

Weekly charts

Year-end charts

Certifications

Release history

References

External links
 

2013 albums
Hurts albums
Sony Music albums